Thomas Henry Hewlett (23 November 1882 – 25 May 1956) was a British Conservative Party politician and industrialist.

He unsuccessfully contested the 1935 general election in Manchester Clayton, but after the death in 1940 of Peter Eckersley, the Member of Parliament (MP) for Manchester Exchange, Hewlett was elected unopposed in the resulting by-election.  He lost the seat in the Labour Party's landslide victory at the 1945 general election.

In addition to his political interests, Hewlett was the chairman and managing director of the Anchor Chemical Company which is based in Clayton, Manchester and is now a subsidiary of the Air Products and Chemicals.

His children included Thomas Clyde Hewlett, who became Baron Hewlett of Swettenham in the County of Chester in 1972 and the actor Donald Hewlett.

References

External links 
 

1882 births
1956 deaths
Conservative Party (UK) MPs for English constituencies
UK MPs 1935–1945
20th-century English businesspeople